Events in the year 1731 in Norway.

Incumbents
Monarch: Christian VI

Events

Christian Rantzau was appointed Governor-General of Norway.
Denmark-Norway introduces a new Royal Standard flag.

Arts and literature

Births

Deaths

16 April – Bartholomæus Deichman, bishop (born 1671).
24 May – Peder Krog, bishop (born 1654). 
5 October – Ditlev Vibe, Governor-general of Norway (born 1670).

See also

References